Railway stations in Tunisia include:
(stations grouped by lines)

Maps 
 UNHCR Atlas Map

Stations served

Existing 
(standard gauge 1435 mm - to the north)

(narrow gauge 1000 mm - to the south)

 Gare Habib Bourguiba Monastir

Proposed 

 Gabès  - Tunisia railhead 1000 mm gauge
   (border) 
 Ras Ajdir  - Libya railhead 1435 mm gauge

Proposed Electrification 
 25 kV AC
 ( 0 km) Tunis
 (23 km) Borj Cédria
 Riadh

See also 
 Rail transport in Tunisia
 Transport in Tunisia
 Railway stations in Libya

References

External links 

 
Railway stations
Railway stations